United States Coast Guard Cutter is the term used by the U.S. Coast Guard for its commissioned vessels. They carry the ship prefix USCGC.

History of the USCG cutters 
The Revenue Marine and the Revenue Cutter Service, as it was known variously throughout the late 18th and the 19th centuries, referred to its ships as cutters.  The term is English in origin and refers to a specific type of vessel, namely, "a small, decked ship with one mast and bowsprit, with a gaff mainsail on a boom, a square yard and topsail, and two jibs or a jib and a staysail." With general usage, that term came to define any vessel of the United Kingdom's HM Customs and Excise and the term was adopted by the U.S. Treasury Department at the creation of what would become the Revenue Marine.  Since that time, no matter what the vessel type, the service has referred to its vessels with permanently assigned crews as cutters.

First ten cutters
In 1790, Congress authorized the Secretary of the Treasury, Alexander Hamilton, to create a maritime service to enforce customs laws (1 Stat. L. 145, 175; 4 August 1790).  Alternatively known as the system of cutters, Revenue Service, and Revenue-Marine this service was officially named the Revenue Cutter Service (12 Stat. L., 639) in 1863. This service was placed under the control of the Treasury Department. The first ten cutters were:

USRC Vigilant
USRC Active  
USRC General Green  
USRC Massachusetts  
USRC Scammel  
USRC Argus  
USRC Virginia  
USRC Diligence  
USRC South Carolina  
USRC Eagle

Current USCG cutter classes and types

460' Polar Security Cutter (WMSP)
420' Icebreaker Healy (WAGB)
418' National Security Cutter (WMSL) 
399' Polar-class icebreaker (WAGB) 
360' Offshore Patrol Cutter (WMSM)
295'  (WIX) 
282' Edenton-class salvage and rescue ship, converted to Medium Endurance Cutter (WMEC) 
270' Medium Endurance Cutter (WMEC) 
240'  (WLBB) 
225' Seagoing Buoy Tender (WLB)
210' Medium Endurance Cutter (WMEC)
175' Coastal Buoy Tender (WLM)
160' Inland Construction Tender (WLIC)
154' Sentinel-class cutter (WPC) 
140' Bay-class icebreaking tug (WTGB)
110' Island-class patrol boat (WPB)
100' Inland Buoy Tender (WLI) 
100' Inland Construction Tender (WLIC) 
 87' Marine Protector-class coastal patrol boat (WPB)
 75' River Buoy Tender (WLR)
 75' Inland Construction Tender (WLIC)
 65' River Buoy Tender (WLR)
 65' Inland Buoy Tender (WLI)
 65' Small Harbor Tug (WYTL)

Historic USCG cutter classes and types

378' High endurance cutter (WHEC)
327'  (WPG)
311'  (WAVP)
306'  (WDE)
269'  (WAGB)
255'  
250' 
240' 
230' Light Icebreaker, redesignated Medium Endurance Cutter (WMEC) 
213' 
213' Medium Endurance Cutter (WMEC)
205' , converted to (WAT) cutter, redesignated (WMEC) 
180' Seagoing buoy tender (WLB)
180' Oceanographic vessel (WAGO)
165' 
165'  
165'  
157'  (WLM)
133'  (WLM)
125'  (WSC)
123' Patrol boat (Deepwater Modified) (WPB) 
110'  (WYTM)
110'  (WYTM)
110'  (WYTM)
 95'  (WPB)
 82'  (WPB)

See also
 United States Ship

Notes 

 
Ship types
Ship prefixes